Msuata is a genus of flowering plants in the ironweed tribe within the sunflower family.

Species
There is only one known species, Msuata buettneri, endemic to Zaire in Central Africa.

References

Flora of the Democratic Republic of the Congo
Monotypic Asteraceae genera
Vernonieae